Brad Evans (born 8 May 1992) is a New Zealand cyclist, who last rode for UCI Continental team .

In 2015 Evans won the Tour of Southland by a very convincing lead of 1 minute 11 seconds. Evans signed with the  squad for the 2018 season.

Major results
2015
 1st Overall Tour of Southland
2016
 1st Stage 7 Tour de Korea
 1st Stage 2 New Zealand Cycle Classic
 5th The REV Classic
2017
 1st Le Race
 4th Road race, National Road Championships

References

External links

1992 births
Living people
New Zealand male cyclists
People from Otago